Lycodryas maculatus, also known commonly as the spotted tree snake,  is a species of snake in the family Pseudoxyrhophiidae. The species is endemic to the Comoros. It is harmless to humans.

Geographic range
L. maculatus is found on the island Mayotte.

Description

Reproduction
L. maculatus is oviparous.

References

Further reading
Günther A (1858). Catalogue of the Colubrine Snakes in the Collection of the British Museum. London: Trustees of the British Museum. (Taylor and Francis, printers). xvi + 281 pp. (Dipsadoboa maculata, new species, p. 183).

Reptiles described in 1858
Taxa named by Albert Günther
Reptiles of the Comoros
Pseudoxyrhophiidae